Netherlands competed at the 1992 Winter Paralympics in Tignes-Albertville, France. The team included 7 athletes, 5 men and 2 women. Competitors from Netherlands won 0 medals to finish 20th in the medal table.

Medalists
No medals are won during these Paralympic games.

Alpine skiing

 Thea Bongers
 Wiel Bouten
 Karel Hanse
 Robert Reijmers
 Martijn Wijsman

Biathlon

 Jan Visser

Cross-country skiing

 Tineke Hekman
 Jan Visser

See also
Netherlands at the Paralympics
Netherlands at the 1992 Winter Olympics

References

External links
International Paralympic Committee official website

Nations at the 1992 Winter Paralympics
1992
Summer Paralympics